Rameshwari may refer to:
 Talluri Rameshwari, Indian actress from Andhra Pradesh
 Rameshwari Nehru, Indian social worker who married into the Nehru family
 Rameshwari Photocopy Service shop copyright case